Four Courts  is a stop on the Luas light-rail tram system in Dublin, Ireland.  It opened in 2004 as a stop on the Red Line.  The Red Line runs east to west along Chancery Street through the city centre, and the Four Courts stop is located to on a section of road closed completely to other traffic, immediately behind the Four Courts, the home of the Court of Appeal, High Court, and Supreme Court of Ireland.  It also provides access to Wood Quay and the offices of Dublin City Council.  It has two edge platforms integrated into the pavement.  The stop connects with a number of Dublin Bus routes.

References

Luas Red Line stops in Dublin (city)